The Modified Hotchkiss machine gun was a Greek improvement of the French Hotchkiss M1926, in turn an evolution of the Hotchkiss M1914 machine gun.

Design
Existing stock of French-built weapons was modernized before World War II in the Greek State Military Material Facility (EYP) of Athens. The main improvement involved the gun's weakest spot, its firing rate which in practice was only 220 rounds/min, about half that of contemporary machine guns. Apart from accomplishing increase to 420 rounds/min and improved stability, the same facilities undertook the production of a large number of auxiliary parts, with minor improvements. The gun was extensively used by the Greek Army during World War II.

Some were captured by Italian Army and used in various places, such as Sicily in 1943.

References

 

World War II infantry weapons of Greece
World War II machine guns
Hotchkiss et Cie